Film Kathi (German: Die Filmkathi) is a 1918 German silent comedy film directed by Franz Eckstein and Rosa Porten and starring Porten, Reinhold Schünzel and Paul Rehkopf.

Cast
 Anna Hänseler
 Rosa Porten
 Paul Rehkopf
 Reinhold Schünzel
 Emil Sondermann
 Hella Tornegg
 Emmy Wyda

References

Bibliography
 Bock, Hans-Michael & Bergfelder, Tim. The Concise CineGraph. Encyclopedia of German Cinema. Berghahn Books, 2009.

External links

1918 films
Films of the Weimar Republic
German silent feature films
Films directed by Franz Eckstein
Films directed by Rosa Porten
German black-and-white films
1918 comedy films
German comedy films
Silent comedy films
1910s German films
1910s German-language films